The collected works of Thomas Aquinas are being edited in the Editio Leonina (established 1879). 
As of 2014, 39 out of a projected 50 volumes have been published.

The  works of Aquinas can be grouped into six categories as follows:
Works written in direct connection to his teaching
Seven systematic disputations (quaestiones disputatae), on:
Truth;
The union of the Incarnate Word;
The soul;
Spiritual creatures;
Virtues;
God’s power; and
Evil.
Twelve quodlibetal disputations
Philosophical commentaries
Eleven commentaries on Aristotle;
Two expositions of works by Boethius;
Two expositions of works by Proclus
Lesser tractates and disputations
Five polemical works;
Five expert opinions, or responsa;
Fifteen letters on theological, philosophical, or political subjects;
Ninety-nine Homilies Upon the Epistles and Gospels for Forty-nine Sundays of the Year
A collection of glosses from the Church Fathers on the Gospels (Catena aurea)
Systematic works (Summa Theologiae, Summa contra Gentiles, Scriptum super Sententiis)
Biblical commentaries on Job, Psalms and Isaiah, Canticles and Jeremiah,  John,  Matthew, and on the epistles of Paul
Nine exegeses of Scriptural books
Liturgical works

Editions
In 1570 the first edition of Aquinas's opera omnia, the so-called editio Piana (from Pius V, the Dominican pope who commissioned it), was produced at the studium of the Roman convent at Santa Maria sopra Minerva, the forerunner of the Pontifical University of Saint Thomas Aquinas, Angelicum.  The critical edition of Aquinas's works is the ongoing edition commissioned by Pope Leo XIII (1882-1903), the so-called Leonine Edition. Abbé Migne published an edition of the Summa Theologiae, in four volumes, as an appendix to his Patrologiae Cursus Completus.  English editions: Joseph Rickaby (London, 1872), J. M. Ashley (London, 1888).

Works in chronological order

Works of uncertain date

Works of uncertain authenticity

Notes

References 
 I. T. Eschmann, O.P., 1956 catalog of Thomas's works

External links 

  Corpus Thomisticum, his complete works in Latin
  Complete works of St. Thomas Aquinas
 Thomas Aquinas works at Somni:
 Aurea expositio sancti Pauli apostoli ad Corinthios. Naples, 1491
 Beati Thomae Aquinatis De ente et essentia. Italy, made between 1477 and 1485. It contains: De ente et essentia, Rescriptum super libro De ente et essentia and De fallaciis.
 Ad regem Cypri de rege et regno. Italy, 1486
 Brevis Compilatio theologie edita a fratre Thoma de Aquino. Italy, made before 1487. It contains: Compendium theologiae.
 Prima pars secunde partis Summe Theologie beati Thome de Aquino. Naples, 1484.  It contains: Prima pars secunde partis de la Summa Theologica.
 Quaestiones disputatae. Naples, made between 1480 and 1493. It contains some of the Quaestiones disputatae of Thomas Aquinas: De spiritualibus creaturis, De anima, De unione Verbi and De virtutibus.
 Thome de Aquino commentum in Marci Evangelium. Naples, 1491

Catholic theology and doctrine